The rock wren (Salpinctes obsoletus) is a small songbird of the wren family native to western North America, Mexico and Central America.  It is the only species in the genus Salpinctes.

Description

Measurements:

 Length: 4.9-5.9 in (12.5-15 cm)
 Weight: 0.5-0.6 oz (15-18 g)
 Wingspan: 8.7-9.4 in (22-24 cm)

They have grey-brown upperparts with small black and white spots and pale grey underparts with a light brown rump. Additional distinctive features include a light grey line over the eye, a long slightly decurved thin bill, a long barred tail and dark legs. They actively hunt on the ground, around and under objects, probing with their bill as their extraction tool. They mainly eat insects and spiders. Its song is a trill that becomes more varied during the nesting season. These birds are permanent residents in the south of their range, but northern populations migrate to warmer areas from the central United States and southwest Canada southwards. They are occasional vagrants in the eastern United States. During the breeding season, they move to dry, rocky locations, including canyons, from southwestern Canada south to Costa Rica to build cup nests in a crevice or cavity, usually among rocks.

References

 Stiles and Skutch,  A guide to the birds of Costa Rica

External links

 Rock Wren by John Audubon
 Rock Wren - Cornell Lab of Ornithology
 Rock Wren - eNature.com
 Rock Wren - USGS Patuxent Bird Information
 Rock Wren photo gallery VIREO

See also
San Benedicto rock wren, a subspecies of Salpinctes that went extinct in 1952

rock wren
Native birds of Western Canada
Native birds of the Western United States
Birds of Mexico
Birds of Central America
rock wren
rock wren